Below there are the squads from the participating teams of the 2013 FIVB Volleyball World League.

Players' age as of 31 May 2013: the tournament's opening day.





































External links

FIVB Volleyball World League squads
2013 in volleyball